Darius Van Arman is an American businessman, co-founder, and co-owner of Secretly Group, an independent label group that is based in Indiana.

Early life 
Van Arman's father was a math professor who grew up in Detroit.

Education and early career 
In 1995 he studied mathematics at the University of Virginia.  Van Arman founded the Jagjaguwar record label in 1996 in Charlottesville, Virginia. In 1999, Van Arman dropped out of school, moved to Bloomington, Indiana, and became partners with Chris Swanson, and together began the Secretly Group.

Van Arman currently serves on the boards of A2IM, SoundExchange and Merlin. The Secretly Group includes the Secretly Canadian and Jagjaguwar labels, Dead Oceans and The Numero Group. Together these labels have represented the following artists:  The War on Drugs, Anohni, Major Lazer, Syl Johnson, Bon Iver and Dinosaur Jr.

References

Living people
American music industry executives
Year of birth missing (living people)
Place of birth missing (living people)
Businesspeople from Pennsylvania
Gonzaga College High School alumni